The Wasenkoepfel (526 m) is a hill northwest of Oberbronn in the  Lower Alsace in the French Vosges. It is the highest point of the southern Wasgau, a Franco-German, cross-border region that comprises the southern part of the Palatinate Forest and the northern part of the Vosges.

Tourism 

The Wasenkoepfel lies on the French long-distance path, the GR 53. It is also accessible on foot from Oberbronn on the path to the ruins of Château du Grand-Arnsberg (German: Burg Groß Arnsburg) taking about three quarters of an hour. There is an observation tower at the top erected in 1887 by the Vosges Club (Club Vosgien); however its view is now restricted by trees.

Notes

External links 
Photo of the tower on the Wasenkoepfel
Walking tour to the Wasenkoepfel (from the Rother Walking Guide to Alsace) (pdf; 902 kB)

Mountains of Bas-Rhin
Observation towers in France
Mountains of the Vosges